Epsom is a rural locality in the Isaac Region, Queensland, Australia.

Road infrastructure
The Peak Downs Highway runs through from south to north-east.

References 

Isaac Region
Localities in Queensland